Arnold's Wrecking Company is the first film written and directed by Steven E. de Souza, released in 1973. It was filmed on Library Place, Princeton, New Jersey, with residents of the home of Ellwood and Shirley Kauffman receiving credits for their work. Business-manager-to be Scott Kauffman made a cameo appearance as the younger version of de Souza's character, Kenny.

Synopsis

From the film's promotional materials:

Reception
The film won the Special Jury Prize at the 1972 Atlanta Film Festival.  It was released in a few venues the following September, with promotion and advertising all but absent when the film's distributor went into bankruptcy at the same time.

The soundtrack, by the band Adom, and produced by East Coast Records, has become something of a cult collectible, and the "Marijuana!" cut (the lyrics simply repetitions of that one word) has been heard frequently on Dr. Demento.

See also
 List of American films of 1973

References

External links
 

1973 films
1973 comedy films
American films about cannabis
American comedy films
Films directed by Steven E. de Souza
1973 directorial debut films
Films with screenplays by Steven E. de Souza
1970s English-language films
1970s American films